Hamo de Belers (also spelt Beleyr, Bellers) was a Priest in the Roman Catholic Church. Not to be confused with Hamo who was Dean of York.

Career
He was appointed Archdeacon of Leicester between 1187–1189.

He was then appointed Dean of Lincoln and was a Prebendary of Aylesbury in 1189 and continued in this role until his death in 1195.

References
 

Year of birth unknown
1195 deaths
British Roman Catholics